Hayley Stadium was a purpose-built motorcycle speedway located at Queensway Meadows on the eastern side of Newport, Wales. In March 2010 the Wasps engaged a minister to lift a gypsy curse on the stadium. In 2012, the Wasps folded, and within a week of closure, the offices in the main stand sustained fire damage; Hayley Stadium was subsequently demolished.

References

Defunct speedway venues in Wales
Stadiums in Newport, Wales